Classmates is an American reality TV show that was aired on Fox in 2003. It was produced by Classmates Online, Inc, Fox Lab, and 20th Television. This show features classmates reunited.

2000s American reality television series
2003 American television series debuts
2003 American television series endings
Class reunions in popular culture
Television series by 20th Century Fox Television